Kerala United Football Club is an Indian professional football club based in Malappuram, Kerala. Founded in 1976 as Calicut Quartz FC, the club was an amateur and academy side during its early years. In December 2011, they announced intention to turn professional and participated in the I-League 2nd Division, currently the third tier of Indian club football. In 2020, "United World Group" (owners of Sheffield United) took over the club and rebranded it as Kerala United.

The club spent a season 2012–13 in the second division and later played in the Kerala Premier League. In 2017–18 Kerala Premier League season, they finished as runners-up. After the takeover of Quartz FC in 2020 by United World Group, the club was rebranded as Kerala United FC. The club initially began their training at Seethi Haji Stadium at Edavanna. Later moved to Malappuram District Sports Complex, which is widely known as Payyanad Stadium.

History
Quartz Football Club was founded in 1976 in Kozhikode, Kerala and since has been growing up step by step from district to state to national level. The Quartz Academy was incorporated in 2009.

In December 2011, they were officially certified by the All India Football Federation to participate in the I-League 2nd Division. For the first time in 2012 I-League 2nd Division quartz fc participated but failed to make an impression. They only got one point in the group stage thereby failing to get promotion.

In 2012–13 season, Quartz FC signed I-League players like Rino Anto, Sabas Saleel, K. Noushad, Manoj Manoharan, Sherin Sam, Kamardeep Singh, Suji Kumar, J. Prasad, P.M. Britto, Salil Usman and Ajmaluddin. Club also signed the top-scorer and player of the tournament at the 2012 Santosh Trophy V.V. Farhad. They appointed Assistant coach Bino George of Chirag United Club Kerala. Later withdrew from the 2013 I-League 2nd Division due to financial instability.

Club managed to win Kozhikode District league back to back in 2011 and 2012. Later in 2013–14, Quartz played with their academy side in the very first edition of Kerala Premier League. After making a late entry in 2017–18 Kerala Premier League season, the club finished as runners-up after losing to Gokulam Kerala in final. They had withdrawn from two editions of Kerala Premier League (2016–17, 2018–19) due to financial issues.

In November 2020, English Premier League Club Sheffield United have taken over Calicut Quartz and rebranded it as Kerala United FC. United World Group, the umbrella firm holding Sheffield, said in a statement that it envisages to make Kerala United a competitive, community-focused football club playing at the highest level possible in Indian football.

P. Haridas, who owned Calicut Quartz FC, is also the president of the Kozhikode District Football Association (KDFA), said a Premier League club coming to the state will bring major changes to Kerala football.
Company director Akshay Das said: “We're looking for an overall development in the state, especially in Malabar.”

As Kerala United, they participated in the 2020–21 Kerala Premier League and qualified for the knockout stages after finishing second in the Group-B with 12 points. In the semi finals, regular time couldn't separate Gokulam Kerala FC and Kerala United FC, match ending goalless. They lost 4–2 on penalties at the Thrissur Municipal Corporation Stadium. In that season, they participated in Independence Day Cup in Assam and finished as runners-up, losing to Assam State Electricity Board SC by 4–3 in penalties. In 2023, the club participated in Stafford Challenge Cup in Bangalore.

Crest, colours & kits

The United World Group had unveiled the crest after rebranding the club which features the Great Hornbill, the official state bird of Kerala. The club is also nicknamed after the bird as "The Hornbills".

The primary colour of team is purple which dominates their home kit, with the hornbill crest in the right side, white shorts and white socks.

Kit manufacturers and shirt sponsors

Kit evolution

Stadium

Former venues
Since 1977, Kerala United FC played its home matches at the EMS Stadium in Kozhikode. 

In 2021, Kerala United FC shifted their base from Kozhikode to Malappuram district Seethi Haji Stadium, located in Edavanna, as their training ground.

Current venue

The club plays its home games at the Payyanad Stadium in nearby town called Manjeri.

Support and rivalry

Supporters
During its time as Calicut Quartz FC, a club recognised Kozhikode fan club named Rose Brigade became the supporters. They are supporting since 2017. The EMS Stadium had seen an average attendance of 45,000. The players and the coach had often acknowledged the fans' support in the success and called them "The 12th Man". Since the rebranding into Kerala United FC and the move into neighbouring Malappuram the club is building a great fan following in the locality.

Rivalries
During their time at Kozhikode as Calicut Quartz FC, they had a rivalry with former National Football League side FC Kochin. They also enjoyed an on field rivalry with another Kozhikode based side Gokulam Kerala FC. The first Kozhikode Derby match between the two teams took place in the final of 2017–18 Kerala Premier League, where Calicut Quartz FC beat Gokulam Kerala FC beat 3–2. Upon change of ownership, team shifted its base from Kozhikode to Malappuram District which introduced a new Malabar Derby in Kerala Premier League. First match after acquisition was in 2020–21 Kerala Premier League semifinals, where two teams locked horns. The match ended as a goalless draw even after full time. Gokulam won 4–2 on penalties.

Statistics

Results

Honours

Players

First-team squad

Notable players
Had international caps for their respective countries whilst playing for Kerala United FC:

India
 Rino Anto (2012)

Bhutan
 Biren Basnet (2018)

Personnel

Current staff

Youth academy

Head coaching record

Corporate hierarchy

Statistics and records

Managerial history
  Shajirudheen Koppilan (2020–2021)
  Bino George (2021–2022)
 Saheed Ramon (2022–)

Affiliated clubs
The following clubs are currently affiliated with KUFC:
 Sheffield United (2020–present)
 Al-Hilal United (2020–present)
 K Beerschot VA (2020–present)
 LB Châteauroux (2021–present)

Honours

Domestic tournaments

League
 Kerala Premier League
Champions (1): 2022–23
Runners-up (1): 2017–18
Kozhikode District League
Champions (2): 2011, 2012
Runners-up (1): 2017, 2018

Cup
Independence Day Cup
Runners-up (1): 2021
Bodousa Cup
Runners-up (1): 2021

See also
 Football in Kerala
 List of football clubs in India
 Sports in Kerala

References

External links

Kerala United FC at GSA
Kerala United FC at Soccerway
Kerala United FC at the-aiff.com

Kerala United FC
Association football clubs established in 1976
1976 establishments in Kerala
Football clubs in Kerala
I-League 2nd Division clubs